René-Pierre Quentin (born 5 August 1943 in Collombey-Muraz) is a former Swiss football player.

He got 34 caps and 9 goals for Switzerland, playing two games at the 1966 World Cup. He scored Switzerland's only goal in the tournament, against Spain.

He is the "uncle" of Yvan, also Swiss international.

References

1943 births
Living people
Swiss men's footballers
1966 FIFA World Cup players
Switzerland international footballers
Association football midfielders
FC Sion players
FC Zürich players
Swiss-French people
Sportspeople from Valais